Spanky can refer to:

Nickname
Chalmers Alford (1955–2008), American guitarist
Spanky Davis (1943-2014), American jazz trumpeter
Spanky DeBrest (1937–1973), American jazz bassist
Frank Dyson (1931-1979), British rugby league footballer
Michael Fincke (born 1967), NASA astronaut
a ring name of Brian Kendrick (born 1979), American professional wrestler
Ed Kirkpatrick (1944–2010), American Major League Baseball utility player
Kevin Long (skateboarder) (born 1984), American professional skateboarder
Spanky Manikan (1942-2018), Filipino actor
George "Spanky" McCurdy (born 1981), American drummer
Elaine McFarlane, vocalist of Spanky and Our Gang, an American 1960s folk-rock band
George McFarland (1928–1993), American child actor who played Spanky in Our Gang
Michael Russell (tennis) (born 1978), American tennis player
Earl Smith Jr. (1965–2016), American acid house musician
Al Spangler (born 1933), American retired Major League Baseball player
Donald Trump (born 1946), related to allegations made by porn star Stormy Daniels
Spanky Wilson (born c.1947), American vocalist

Given name
Spanky Spangler (born 1947), American daredevil

Fictional
A character in the Our Gang (aka The Little Rascals) comedies
Spanky Ham, a character on the Comedy Central program Drawn Together

Other
Spanky (film), an Our Gang short film
Spanky, a 1994 novel by Christopher Fowler
Spanky and Our Gang, pop band
Spanky and Our Gang (album), album
Spanky & Our Gang Live, album
Glim Spanky, Japanese rock band
General Spanky, comedy film
Captain Spanky's Showboat, comedy film
Spanky's Quest, action game

Lists of people by nickname
Disambiguation pages with given-name-holder lists